Rong County, Rongxian, or Junghsien may refer to:

Rong County, Guangxi (容县)
Rong County, Sichuan (荣县)